William Wilberforce (24 August 175929 July 1833) was a British politician, philanthropist and leader of the movement to abolish the slave trade. A native of Kingston upon Hull, Yorkshire, he began his political career in 1780, eventually becoming an independent Member of Parliament (MP) for Yorkshire (1784–1812). In 1785, he became an evangelical Christian, which resulted in major changes to his lifestyle and a lifelong concern for reform.

In 1787, Wilberforce came into contact with Thomas Clarkson and a group of activists against the slave trade, including Granville Sharp, Hannah More and Charles Middleton. They persuaded Wilberforce to take on the cause of abolition, and he soon became the leading English abolitionist. He headed the parliamentary campaign against the British Slave Trade for 20 years until the passage of the Slave Trade Act of 1807.

Wilberforce was convinced of the importance of religion, morality and education. He championed causes and campaigns such as the Society for the Suppression of Vice, British missionary work in India, the creation of a free colony in Sierra Leone, the foundation of the Church Mission Society and the Society for the Prevention of Cruelty to Animals. His underlying conservatism led him to support politically and socially controversial legislation, which resulted in criticism that he was ignoring injustices at home while campaigning for the enslaved abroad.

In later years, Wilberforce supported the campaign for the complete abolition of slavery and continued his involvement after 1826, when he resigned from Parliament because of his failing health. That campaign led to the Slavery Abolition Act 1833, which abolished slavery in most of the British Empire. Wilberforce died just three days after hearing that the passage of the Act through Parliament was assured. He was buried in Westminster Abbey, close to his friend William Pitt the Younger.

Early life and education

Wilberforce was born in a merchant's house on the High Street of Hull, in the East Riding of Yorkshire, England, on 24 August 1759. (Wilberforce House is now a historic house museum.) He was the only son of Robert Wilberforce (1728–1768), a wealthy merchant, and his wife, Elizabeth Bird (1730–1798). His grandfather, William (1690–1774), had made the family fortune in the Baltic maritime trade and in sugar refining. He was a partner in a business that built the Old Sugar House on Lime Street, which imported raw sugar from plantations in the West Indies. He was twice elected mayor of Hull.

Wilberforce was a small, sickly and delicate child with poor eyesight. In 1767, he began attending Hull Grammar School, which at the time was headed by a young, dynamic headmaster, Joseph Milner, who was to become a lifelong friend. Wilberforce profited from the supportive atmosphere at the school, until his father's death in 1768 caused changes in his living arrangements. He attended an "indifferent" boarding school in Putney for two years. He spent his holidays in Wimbledon, where he grew extremely fond of his relatives. He became interested in evangelical Christianity due to his relatives' influence, especially that of his aunt Hannah, sister of the wealthy merchant John Thornton, a philanthropist and a supporter of the leading Methodist preacher George Whitefield.

Wilberforce's staunchly Church of England mother and grandfather, alarmed at these nonconformist influences and at his leanings towards evangelicalism, brought the 12-year-old boy back to Hull in 1771. Wilberforce was heartbroken at being separated from his aunt and uncle. His family opposed a return to Hull Grammar School because the headmaster had become a Methodist, and Wilberforce therefore continued his education at nearby Pocklington School from 1771 to 1776. Influenced by Methodist scruples, he initially resisted Hull's lively social life, but, as his religious fervour diminished, he embraced theatre-going, attended balls, and played cards.

In October 1776, at the age of 17, Wilberforce went up to St John's College, Cambridge. The deaths of his grandfather in 1774 and his uncle three years later had left him independently wealthy and as a result he had little inclination or need to apply himself to serious study. Instead he immersed himself in the social round of student life and pursued a hedonistic lifestyle, enjoying cards, gambling and late-night drinking sessions – although he found the excesses of some of his fellow students distasteful. Witty, generous and an excellent conversationalist, Wilberforce was a popular figure. He made many friends, including the more studious future Prime Minister William Pitt. Despite his lifestyle and lack of interest in studying, he managed to pass his examinations and was awarded a Bachelor of Arts degree in 1781 and a Master of Arts degree in 1788.

Early parliamentary career
Wilberforce began to consider a political career while still at university during the winter of 1779–1780, while he and Pitt frequently watched House of Commons debates from the gallery. Pitt, already set on a political career, encouraged Wilberforce to join him in obtaining a parliamentary seat. In September 1780, at the age of twenty-one and while still a student, Wilberforce was elected Member of Parliament (MP) for Kingston upon Hull, spending over £8,000, as was the custom of the time, to ensure he received the necessary votes. Free from financial pressures, Wilberforce sat as an independent, resolving to be a "no party man". Criticised at times for inconsistency, he supported both Tory and Whig governments according to his conscience, working closely with the party in power, and voting on specific measures according to their merits.

Wilberforce attended Parliament regularly, but he also maintained a lively social life, becoming an habitué of gentlemen's gambling clubs such as Goostree's and Boodle's in Pall Mall, London. The writer and socialite Madame de Staël described him as the "wittiest man in England" and, according to Georgiana, Duchess of Devonshire, the Prince of Wales said that he would go anywhere to hear Wilberforce sing.

Wilberforce used his speaking voice to great effect in political speeches; the diarist and author James Boswell witnessed Wilberforce's eloquence in the House of Commons and noted, "I saw what seemed a mere shrimp mount upon the table; but as I listened, he grew, and grew, until the shrimp became a whale." During the frequent government changes of 1781–1784, Wilberforce supported his friend Pitt in parliamentary debates.

In autumn 1783, Pitt, Wilberforce and Edward Eliot (later to become Pitt's brother-in-law), travelled to France for a six-week holiday together. After a difficult start in Rheims, where their presence aroused police suspicion that they were English spies, they visited Paris, meeting Benjamin Franklin, General Lafayette, Marie Antoinette and Louis XVI, and joined the French court at Fontainebleau.

Pitt became Prime Minister in December 1783, with Wilberforce a key supporter of his minority government. Despite their close friendship, there is no record that Pitt offered Wilberforce a ministerial position in that or future governments. This may have been due to Wilberforce's wish to remain an independent MP. Alternatively, Wilberforce's frequent tardiness and disorganisation, as well as his chronic eye problems that at times made reading impossible, may have convinced Pitt that his trusted friend was not ministerial material. Wilberforce never sought office and was never offered one. When Parliament was dissolved in the spring of 1784, Wilberforce decided to stand as a candidate for the county of Yorkshire in the 1784 general election. On 6 April, he was returned as MP for Yorkshire at the age of twenty-four.

Conversion
In October 1784, Wilberforce embarked upon a tour of Europe which would ultimately change his life and determine his future career. He travelled with his mother and sister in the company of Isaac Milner, the brilliant younger brother of his former headmaster, who had been Fellow of Queens' College, Cambridge, in the year when Wilberforce first went up. They visited the French Riviera and enjoyed the usual pastimes of dinners, cards, and gambling. In February 1785, Wilberforce returned to London temporarily, to support Pitt's proposals for parliamentary reforms. He rejoined the party in Genoa, Italy, from where they continued their tour to Switzerland. Milner accompanied Wilberforce to England, and on the journey they read The Rise and Progress of Religion in the Soul by Philip Doddridge, a leading early 18th-century English nonconformist.

After his earlier interest in evangelical religion when he was young, Wilberforce's journey to faith seems to have begun afresh at this time. He started to rise early to read the Bible and pray and kept a private journal. He underwent an evangelical conversion, regretting his past life and resolving to commit his future life and work to the service of God. His conversion changed some of his habits, but not his nature: he remained outwardly cheerful, interested and respectful, tactfully urging others towards his new faith. Inwardly, he underwent an agonising struggle and became relentlessly self-critical, harshly judging his spirituality, use of time, vanity, self-control and relationships with others.

At the time, religious enthusiasm was generally regarded as a social transgression and was stigmatised in polite society. Evangelicals in the upper classes, such as Sir Richard Hill, the Methodist MP for Shropshire, and Selina Hastings, Countess of Huntingdon, were exposed to contempt and ridicule, and Wilberforce's conversion led him to question whether he should remain in public life. He sought guidance from John Newton, a leading evangelical Anglican clergyman of the day and Rector of St Mary Woolnoth in the City of London. Both Newton and Pitt counselled him to remain in politics, and he resolved to do so "with increased diligence and conscientiousness". Thereafter, his political views were informed by his faith and by his desire to promote Christianity and Christian ethics in private and public life. His views were often deeply conservative, opposed to radical changes in a God-given political and social order, and focused on issues such as the observance of the Sabbath and the eradication of immorality through education and reform. As a result, he was often distrusted by progressive voices because of his conservatism, and regarded with suspicion by many Tories who saw evangelicals as radicals, bent on the overthrow of church and state.

In 1786, Wilberforce leased a house in Old Palace Yard, Westminster, in order to be near Parliament. He began using his parliamentary position to advocate reform by introducing a Registration Bill, proposing limited changes to parliamentary election procedures. He brought forward a bill to extend the measure permitting the dissection after execution of criminals such as rapists, arsonists and thieves. The bill also advocated the reduction of sentences for women convicted of treason, a crime that at the time included a husband's murder. The House of Commons passed both bills, but they were defeated in the House of Lords.

Abolition of the transatlantic slave trade

Initial decision
The British initially became involved in the slave trade during the 16th century. By 1783, the triangular route that took British-made goods to Africa to buy slaves, transported the enslaved to the West Indies, and then brought slave-grown products such as sugar, tobacco, and cotton to Britain, represented about 80 percent of Great Britain's foreign income. British ships dominated the slave trade, supplying French, Spanish, Dutch, Portuguese and British colonies, and in peak years carried forty thousand enslaved men, women and children across the Atlantic in the horrific conditions of the middle passage. Of the estimated 11 million Africans transported into slavery, about 1.4 million died during the voyage.

The British campaign to abolish the slave trade is generally considered to have begun in the 1780s with the establishment of the Quakers' anti-slavery committees, and their presentation to Parliament of the first slave trade petition in 1783. The same year, Wilberforce, while dining with his old Cambridge friend Gerard Edwards, met Rev. James Ramsay, a ship's surgeon who had become a clergyman on the island of St Christopher (later St Kitts) in the Leeward Islands, and a medical supervisor of the plantations there. What Ramsay had witnessed of the conditions endured by the slaves, both at sea and on the plantations, horrified him. Returning to England after fifteen years, he accepted the living of Teston, Kent in 1781, and there met Sir Charles Middleton, Lady Middleton, Thomas Clarkson, Hannah More and others, a group that later became known as the Testonites. Interested in promoting Christianity and moral improvement in Britain and overseas, they were appalled by Ramsay's reports of the depraved lifestyles of slave owners, the cruel treatment meted out to the enslaved, and the lack of Christian instruction provided to the slaves. With their encouragement and help, Ramsay spent three years writing An essay on the treatment and conversion of African slaves in the British sugar colonies, which was highly critical of slavery in the West Indies. The book, published in 1784, was to have an important impact in raising public awareness and interest, and it excited the ire of West Indian planters who in the coming years attacked both Ramsay and his ideas in a series of pro-slavery tracts.

Wilberforce apparently did not follow up on his meeting with Ramsay. However, three years later, and inspired by his new faith, Wilberforce was growing interested in humanitarian reform. In November 1786, he received a letter from Sir Charles Middleton that re-opened his interest in the slave trade. At the urging of Lady Middleton, Sir Charles suggested that Wilberforce bring forward the abolition of the slave trade in Parliament. Wilberforce responded that he "felt the great importance of the subject, and thought himself unequal to the task allotted to him, but yet would not positively decline it". He began to read widely on the subject, and met with the Testonites at Middleton's home at Barham Court in Teston in the early winter of 1786–1787.

In early 1787, Thomas Clarkson, a fellow graduate of St John's, Cambridge, who had become convinced of the need to end the slave trade after writing a prize-winning essay on the subject while at Cambridge, called upon Wilberforce at Old Palace Yard with a published copy of the work. This was the first time the two men had met; their collaboration would last nearly fifty years. Clarkson began to visit Wilberforce on a weekly basis, bringing first-hand evidence he had obtained about the slave trade.
The Quakers, already working for abolition, also recognised the need for influence within Parliament, and urged Clarkson to secure a commitment from Wilberforce to bring forward the case for abolition in the House of Commons.

It was arranged that Bennet Langton, a Lincolnshire landowner and mutual acquaintance of Wilberforce and Clarkson, would organize a dinner party in order to ask Wilberforce formally to lead the parliamentary campaign. The dinner took place on 13 March 1787; other guests included Charles Middleton, Sir Joshua Reynolds, William Windham MP, James Boswell and Isaac Hawkins Browne MP. By the end of the evening, Wilberforce had agreed in general terms that he would bring forward the abolition of the slave trade in Parliament, "provided that no person more proper could be found".

The same spring, on 12 May 1787, the still hesitant Wilberforce held a conversation with William Pitt and the future Prime Minister William Grenville as they sat under a large oak tree on Pitt's estate in Kent. Under what came to be known as the "Wilberforce Oak" at Holwood House, Pitt challenged his friend: "Wilberforce, why don't you give notice of a motion on the subject of the Slave Trade? You have already taken great pains to collect evidence, and are therefore fully entitled to the credit which doing so will ensure you. Do not lose time, or the ground will be occupied by another." Wilberforce's response is not recorded, but he later declared in old age that he could "distinctly remember the very knoll on which I was sitting near Pitt and Grenville" where he made his decision.

Wilberforce's involvement in the abolition movement was motivated by a desire to put his Christian principles into action and to serve God in public life. He and other evangelicals were horrified by what they perceived was a depraved and un-Christian trade, and the greed and avarice of the owners and traders. Wilberforce sensed a call from God, writing in a journal entry in 1787 that "God Almighty has set before me two great objects, the suppression of the Slave Trade and the Reformation of Manners [moral values]". The conspicuous involvement of evangelicals in the highly popular anti-slavery movement served to improve the status of a group otherwise associated with the less popular campaigns against vice and immorality.

Early parliamentary action
On 22 May 1787, the first meeting of the Society for Effecting the Abolition of the Slave Trade took place, bringing like-minded British Quakers and Anglicans together in the same organization for the first time. The committee chose to campaign against the slave trade rather than slavery itself, with many members believing that slavery would eventually disappear as a natural consequence of the abolition of the trade. Wilberforce, though involved informally, did not join the committee officially until 1791. 

The society was highly successful in raising public awareness and support, and local chapters sprang up throughout Great Britain. Clarkson travelled the country researching and collecting first-hand testimony and statistics, while the committee promoted the campaign, pioneering techniques such as lobbying, writing pamphlets, holding public meetings, gaining press attention, organising boycotts and even using a campaign logo: an image of a kneeling slave above the motto "Am I not a Man and a Brother?", designed by the renowned pottery-maker Josiah Wedgwood. The committee also sought to influence slave-trading nations such as France, Spain, Portugal, Denmark, Holland and the United States, corresponding with anti-slavery activists in other countries and organising the translation of English-language books and pamphlets. These included books by former slaves Ottobah Cugoano and Olaudah Equiano, who had published influential works on slavery and the slave trade in 1787 and 1789 respectively. They and other free blacks, collectively known as "Sons of Africa", spoke at debating societies and wrote spirited letters to newspapers, periodicals and prominent figures, as well as public letters of support to campaign allies. Hundreds of parliamentary petitions opposing the slave trade were received in 1788 and following years, with hundreds of thousands of signatories in total. The campaign proved to be the world's first grassroots human rights campaign, in which men and women from different social classes and backgrounds volunteered to try to end the injustices suffered by others.

Wilberforce had planned to introduce a motion giving notice that he would bring forward a bill for the Abolition of the Slave Trade during the 1789 parliamentary session. However, in January 1788, he was taken ill with a probable stress-related condition, now thought to be ulcerative colitis. It was several months before he was able to resume work, and he spent time convalescing at Bath and Cambridge. His regular bouts of gastrointestinal illnesses precipitated the use of moderate quantities of opium, which proved effective in alleviating his condition, and which he continued to use for the rest of his life.

In Wilberforce's absence, Pitt, who had long been supportive of abolition, introduced the preparatory motion himself, and ordered a Privy Council investigation into the slave trade, followed by a House of Commons review.

With the publication of the Privy Council report in April 1789 and following months of planning, Wilberforce commenced his parliamentary campaign. On 12 May 1789, he made his first major speech on the subject of abolition in the House of Commons, in which he reasoned that the trade was morally reprehensible and an issue of natural justice. Drawing on Thomas Clarkson's mass of evidence, he described in detail the appalling conditions in which slaves travelled from Africa in the middle passage, and argued that abolishing the trade would also bring an improvement to the conditions of existing slaves in the West Indies. He moved 12 resolutions condemning the slave trade, but made no reference to the abolition of slavery itself, instead dwelling on the potential for reproduction in the existing slave population should the trade be abolished. With the tide running against them, the opponents of abolition delayed the vote by proposing that the House of Commons hear its own evidence, and Wilberforce, in a move that has subsequently been criticised for prolonging the slave trade, reluctantly agreed. The hearings were not completed by the end of the parliamentary session, and were deferred until the following year. In the meantime, Wilberforce and Clarkson tried unsuccessfully to take advantage of the egalitarian atmosphere of the French Revolution to press for France's abolition of the trade, which was, in any event, to be abolished in 1794 as a result of the bloody slave revolt in St. Domingue (later to be known as Haiti), although later briefly restored by Napoleon in 1802. In January 1790, Wilberforce succeeded in speeding up the hearings by gaining approval for a smaller parliamentary select committee to consider the vast quantity of evidence which had been accumulated. Wilberforce's house in Old Palace Yard became a centre for the abolitionists' campaign and a focus for many strategy meetings. Petitioners for other causes also besieged him there, and his ante-room was thronged from an early hour, like "Noah's Ark, full of beasts clean and unclean", according to Hannah More.

Interrupted by a general election in June 1790, the committee finally finished hearing witnesses, and in April 1791 with a closely reasoned four-hour speech, Wilberforce introduced the first parliamentary bill to abolish the slave trade. However, after two evenings of debate, the bill was easily defeated by 163 votes to 88, the political climate having swung in a conservative direction in the wake of the French Revolution and in reaction to an increase in radicalism and to slave revolts in the French West Indies. Such was the public hysteria of the time that even Wilberforce himself was suspected by some of being a Jacobin agitator.

This was the beginning of a protracted parliamentary campaign, during which Wilberforce's commitment never wavered, despite frustration and hostility. He was supported in his work by fellow members of the so-called Clapham Sect, among whom was his best friend and cousin Henry Thornton. Holding evangelical Christian convictions, and consequently dubbed "the Saints", the group mainly lived in large houses surrounding the common in Clapham, then a village to the south-west of London. Wilberforce accepted an invitation to share a house with Henry Thornton in 1792, moving into his own home after Thornton's marriage in 1796. The "Saints" were an informal community, characterised by considerable intimacy as well as a commitment to practical Christianity and an opposition to slavery. They developed a relaxed family atmosphere, wandering freely in and out of each other's homes and gardens, and discussing the many religious, social and political topics that engaged them.

Pro-slavery advocates claimed that enslaved Africans were lesser human beings who benefited from their bondage. Wilberforce, the Clapham Sect and others were anxious to demonstrate that Africans, and particularly freed slaves, had human and economic abilities beyond the slave trade, and that they were capable of sustaining a well-ordered society, trade and cultivation. Inspired in part by the utopian vision of Granville Sharp, they became involved in the establishment in 1792 of a free colony in Sierra Leone with black settlers from Britain, Nova Scotia and Jamaica, as well as native Africans and some whites. They formed the Sierra Leone Company, with Wilberforce subscribing liberally to the project in money and time. The dream was of an ideal society in which races would mix on equal terms; the reality was fraught with tension, crop failures, disease, death, war and defections to the slave trade. Initially a commercial venture, the British government assumed responsibility for the colony in 1808. The colony, although troubled at times, was to become a symbol of anti-slavery in which residents, communities and African tribal chiefs, worked together to prevent enslavement at the source, supported by a British naval blockade to stem the region's slave trade.

On 2 April 1792, Wilberforce again brought a bill calling for abolition. The memorable debate that followed drew contributions from the greatest orators in the house, William Pitt the Younger and Charles James Fox, as well as from Wilberforce himself. Henry Dundas, as Home Secretary, proposed a compromise solution of gradual abolition of the Slave Trade, over a number of years. This was passed by 230 to 85 votes.

War with France
On 26 February 1793, another vote to abolish the slave trade was narrowly defeated by eight votes. The outbreak of war with France the same month effectively prevented any further serious consideration of the issue, as politicians concentrated on the national crisis and the threat of invasion. The same year, and again in 1794, Wilberforce unsuccessfully brought before Parliament a bill to outlaw British ships from supplying slaves to foreign colonies. He voiced his concern about the war and urged Pitt and his government to make greater efforts to end hostilities. Growing more alarmed, on 31 December 1794, Wilberforce moved that the government seek a peaceful resolution with France, a stance that created a temporary breach in his long friendship with Pitt. Henry Dundas, 1st Viscount Melville, who was Pitt's Secretary of State for War, instructed Sir Adam Williamson, the lieutenant-governor of Jamaica, to sign an agreement with representatives of the French colonists of Saint Domingue, later Haiti, that promised to restore the ancien regime, slavery and discrimination against mixed-race colonists, a move that drew criticism from abolitionists Wilberforce and Clarkson.

Abolition continued to be associated in the public consciousness with the French Revolution and with British radical groups, resulting in a decline in public support. In 1795, the Society for Effecting the Abolition of the Slave Trade ceased to meet, and Clarkson retired in ill-health to the Lake District.
In 1795 leave to bring in a bill for abolition of the slave trade was refused in the commons by 78 to 61; and in 1796, though he succeeded in carrying the same measure to a third reading, it was then rejected on 15 March 1796 by 74 to 70. Henry Dundas, who secured the 1792 commons "gradual" abolition of slave trade bill; to end on 1 January 1796, voted AYE, in support. Enough of his supporters, to have carried it were, as Wilberforce complains, attending a new comic opera.
However, despite the decreased interest in abolition, Wilberforce continued to introduce abolition bills throughout the 1790s.

The early years of the 19th century once again saw an increased public interest in abolition. In 1804, Clarkson resumed his work and the Society for Effecting the Abolition of the Slave Trade began meeting again, strengthened with prominent new members such as Zachary Macaulay, Henry Brougham and James Stephen. In June 1804, Wilberforce's bill to abolish the slave trade successfully passed all its stages through the House of Commons. However, it was too late in the parliamentary session for it to complete its passage through the House of Lords. On its reintroduction during the 1805 session, it was defeated, with even the usually sympathetic Pitt failing to support it. On this occasion and throughout the campaign, abolition was held back by Wilberforce's trusting, even credulous nature, and his deferential attitude towards those in power. He found it difficult to believe that men of rank would not do what he perceived to be the right thing, and was reluctant to confront them when they did not.

Final phase of the campaign

Following Pitt's death in January 1806, Wilberforce began to collaborate more with the Whigs, especially the abolitionists. He gave general support to the Grenville–Fox administration, which brought more abolitionists into the cabinet; Wilberforce and Charles Fox led the campaign in the House of Commons, while Lord Grenville advocated the cause in the House of Lords. A radical change of tactics, which involved the introduction of a bill to ban British subjects from aiding or participating in the slave trade to the French colonies, was suggested by maritime lawyer James Stephen. It was a shrewd move, since the majority of British ships were now flying American flags and supplying slaves to foreign colonies with whom Britain was at war. 

A bill was introduced and approved by the cabinet, and Wilberforce and other abolitionists maintained a self-imposed silence, so as not to draw any attention to the effect of the bill. The approach proved successful, and the new Foreign Slave Trade Bill was quickly passed, and received royal assent on 23 May 1806. Wilberforce and Clarkson had collected a large volume of evidence against the slave trade over the previous two decades, and Wilberforce spent the latter part of 1806 writing A Letter on the Abolition of the Slave Trade, which was a comprehensive restatement of the abolitionists' case. The death of Fox in September 1806 was a blow, but was followed quickly by a general election in the autumn of 1806. Slavery became an election issue, bringing more abolitionist MPs into the House of Commons, including former military men who had experienced the horrors of slavery and slave revolts. 

Wilberforce was re-elected as an MP for Yorkshire, after which he returned to finishing and publishing his Letter, in reality a 400-page book which formed the basis for the final phase of the campaign. Lord Grenville, the Prime Minister, was determined to introduce an Abolition Bill in the House of Lords, rather than in the House of Commons, taking it through its greatest challenge first. When a final vote was taken, the bill was passed in the House of Lords by a large margin. Sensing a breakthrough that had been long anticipated, Charles Grey moved for a second reading in the Commons on 23 February 1807. As tributes were made to Wilberforce, whose face streamed with tears, the bill was carried by 283 votes to 16. Excited supporters suggested taking advantage of the large majority to seek the abolition of slavery itself, but Wilberforce made it clear that total emancipation was not the immediate goal: "They had for the present no object immediately before them, but that of putting stop directly to the carrying of men in British ships to be sold as slaves." The Slave Trade Act received royal assent on 25 March 1807.

Personal life
In his youth, William Wilberforce showed little interest in women, but when he was in his late thirties his friend Thomas Babington recommended twenty-year-old Barbara Ann Spooner (1777–1847) as a potential bride. Wilberforce met her two days later on 15 April 1797, and was immediately smitten; following an eight-day whirlwind romance, he proposed. Despite the urgings of friends to slow down, the couple married at the Church of St Swithin in Bath, Somerset, on 30 May 1797. They were devoted to each other, and Barbara was very attentive and supportive to Wilberforce in his increasing ill health, though she showed little interest in his political activities. They had six children in fewer than ten years: William (born 1798), Barbara (born 1799), Elizabeth (born 1801), Robert (born 1802), Samuel (born 1805) and Henry (born 1807). Wilberforce was an indulgent and adoring father who revelled in his time at home and at play with his children.

Other concerns

Political and social reform
Wilberforce was highly conservative on many political and social issues. He advocated change in society through Christianity and improvement in morals, education and religion, fearing and opposing radical causes and revolution. The radical writer William Cobbett was among those who attacked what they saw as Wilberforce's hypocrisy in campaigning for better working conditions for slaves while British workers lived in terrible conditions at home. "Never have you done one single act, in favour of the labourers of this country", he wrote. Critics noted Wilberforce's support of the suspension of habeas corpus in 1795 and his votes for Pitt's "Gagging Bills", which banned meetings of more than 50 people, allowing speakers to be arrested and imposing harsh penalties on those who attacked the constitution. Wilberforce was opposed to giving workers' rights to organise into unions, in 1799 speaking in favour of the Combination Act, which suppressed trade union activity throughout Britain, and calling unions "a general disease in our society". He also opposed an enquiry into the 1819 Peterloo Massacre in which eleven protesters were killed at a political rally demanding reform. Concerned about "bad men who wished to produce anarchy and confusion", he approved of the government's Six Acts, which further limited public meetings and seditious writings. Wilberforce's actions led the essayist William Hazlitt to condemn him as one "who preaches vital Christianity to untutored savages, and tolerates its worst abuses in civilised states."

Wilberforce's views of women and religion were also conservative. He disapproved of women anti-slavery activists such as Elizabeth Heyrick, who organised women's abolitionist groups in the 1820s, protesting: "[F]or ladies to meet, to publish, to go from house to house stirring up petitions—these appear to me proceedings unsuited to the female character as delineated in Scripture." Wilberforce initially strongly opposed bills for Catholic emancipation, which would have allowed Catholics to become MPs, hold public office and serve in the army, although by 1813, he had changed his views and spoke in favour of a similar bill.

More progressively, Wilberforce advocated legislation to improve the working conditions for chimney-sweeps and textile workers, engaged in prison reform, and supported campaigns to restrict capital punishment and the severe punishments meted out under the Game laws. He recognised the importance of education in alleviating poverty, and when Hannah More and her sister established Sunday schools for the poor in Somerset and the Mendips, he provided financial and moral support as they faced opposition from landowners and Anglican clergy. From the late 1780s onward, Wilberforce campaigned for limited parliamentary reform, such as the abolition of rotten boroughs and the redistribution of Commons seats to growing towns and cities, though by 1832, he feared that such measures went too far. With others, Wilberforce founded the world's first animal welfare organisation, the Society for the Prevention of Cruelty to Animals (later the Royal Society for the Prevention of Cruelty to Animals). In 1824, Wilberforce was one of over 30 eminent gentlemen who put their names at the inaugural public meeting to the fledgling National Institution for the Preservation of Life from Shipwreck, later named the Royal National Lifeboat Institution. He was also opposed to duelling, which he described as the "disgrace of a Christian society" and was appalled when his friend Pitt engaged in a duel with George Tierney in 1798, particularly as it occurred on a Sunday, the Christian day of rest.

Wilberforce was generous with his time and money, believing that those with wealth had a duty to give a significant portion of their income to the needy. Yearly, he gave away thousands of pounds, much of it to clergymen to distribute in their parishes. He paid off the debts of others, supported education and missions, and in a year of food shortages, gave to charity more than his own yearly income. He was exceptionally hospitable, and could not bear to sack any of his servants. As a result, his home was full of old and incompetent servants kept on in charity. Although he was often months behind in his correspondence, Wilberforce responded to numerous requests for advice or for help in obtaining professorships, military promotions and livings for clergymen, or for the reprieve of death sentences.

Evangelical Christianity
A supporter of the evangelical wing of the Church of England, Wilberforce believed that the revitalisation of the church and individual Christian observance would lead to a harmonious, moral society. He sought to elevate the status of religion in public and private life, making piety fashionable in both the upper- and middle-classes of society. To this end, in April 1797, Wilberforce published A Practical View of the Prevailing Religious System of Professed Christians in the Higher and Middle Classes of This Country Contrasted With Real Christianity, on which he had been working since 1793. This was an exposition of New Testament doctrine and teachings and a call for a revival of Christianity, as a response to the moral decline of the nation, illustrating his own personal testimony and the views which inspired him. The book proved to be influential and a best-seller by the standards of the day; 7,500 copies were sold within six months, and it was translated into several languages.

Wilberforce fostered and supported missionary activity in Britain and abroad, involved with other members of the Clapham Sect in various evangelical and charitable organisations.

He was a founding member of the Church Missionary Society (since renamed the Church Mission Society); and first vice-president of the London Society for promoting Christianity among the Jews, which worked to convert mainly poor immigrants Jews to Christianity, and claimed widespread success. He was horrified by the lack of Christian evangelism in India, Wilberforce used the 1793 renewal of the British East India Company's charter to propose the addition of clauses requiring the company to provide teachers and chaplains and to commit to the "religious improvement" of Indians. The plan was unsuccessful due to lobbying by the directors of the company, who feared that their commercial interests would be damaged. Wilberforce tried again in 1813, when the charter next came up for renewal. Using petitions, meetings, lobbying and letter writing, he successfully campaigned for changes to the charter. Speaking in favour of the Charter Act 1813, he criticised the East India Company and their rule in India for its hypocrisy and racial prejudice, while also condemning aspects of Hinduism including the caste system, infanticide, polygamy and suttee. "Our religion is sublime, pure beneficent", he said, "theirs is mean, licentious and cruel".

Moral reform
Greatly concerned by what he perceived to be the degeneracy of British society, Wilberforce was also active in matters of moral reform, lobbying against "the torrent of profaneness that every day makes more rapid advances", and considered this issue and the abolition of the slave trade as equally important goals. Indeed, in 1787 he declared it one of his two "great objects" or lifelong goals. In a letter to his friend Christopher Wyvill, Wilberforce wrote "The barbarous custom of hanging has been tried for too long and with the success which might have been expected from it. The most effectual way to prevent greater crimes is by punishing the smaller, ...". Metaxas goes on to claim a similarity to the Broken windows theory.

At the suggestion of Wilberforce and Bishop Porteus, King George III was requested by the Archbishop of Canterbury to issue in 1787 the Proclamation for the Discouragement of Vice, as a remedy for the rising tide of immorality. The proclamation commanded the prosecution of those guilty of "excessive drinking, blasphemy, profane swearing and cursing, lewdness, profanation of the Lord's Day, and other dissolute, immoral, or disorderly practices". Greeted largely with public indifference, Wilberforce sought to increase its impact by mobilising public figures to the cause, and by founding the Society for the Suppression of Vice. This and other societies in which Wilberforce was a prime mover, such as the Proclamation Society, mustered support for the prosecution of those who had been charged with violating relevant laws, including brothel keepers, distributors of pornographic material, and those who did not respect the Sabbath.

Years later, the writer and clergyman Sydney Smith criticised Wilberforce for being more interested in the sins of the poor than those of the rich, and suggested that a better name would have been the Society for "suppressing the vices of persons whose income does not exceed £500 per annum". The societies were not highly successful in terms of membership and support, although their activities did lead to the imprisonment of Thomas Williams, the London printer of Thomas Paine's The Age of Reason. Wilberforce's attempts to legislate against adultery and Sunday newspapers were also in vain; his involvement and leadership in other, less punitive, approaches were more successful in the long-term, however. By the end of his life, British morals, manners, and sense of social responsibility had increased, paving the way for future changes in societal conventions and attitudes during the Victorian era.

Emancipation of enslaved Africans
The hopes of the abolitionists notwithstanding, slavery did not wither with the end of the slave trade in the British Empire, nor did the living conditions of the enslaved improve. The trade continued, with few countries following suit by abolishing the trade, and with some British ships disregarding the legislation. Wilberforce worked with the members of the African Institution to ensure the enforcement of abolition and to promote abolitionist negotiations with other countries. In particular, the United States had placed into effect its policy of abolishing the slave trade after 1808 according to the section of its U.S. Constitution drawn up two decades earlier by their Constitutional Convention in Philadelphia back during the summer of 1787, directing the ending of American participation in the trans-Atlantic slave trade by the future year of 1808 after an interim period of twenty years and Wilberforce lobbied the American government to enforce its now own mandated prohibition more strongly. Eventually a squadron of the small but growing United States Navy led by their old and famous  heavy frigate U.S.F. Constellation, veteran of the French naval Quasi-War, the Barbary Wars versus North African states, and the War of 1812 (built in Baltimore as one of first six original warships of the infant U.S. fleet), in the 1790s–1800s was stationed off the West African Coast on a regular basis showing growing American naval power and coordinating with the Royal Navy cruisers' interdiction efforts in the next few decades.

The same year, Wilberforce moved his family from Clapham to a sizable mansion with a large garden in Kensington Gore, closer to the Houses of Parliament at old Westminster Palace. Never strong, and by 1812 in worsening health, Wilberforce resigned his Yorkshire seat, and became MP for the rotten borough of Bramber in Sussex, a seat with much lesser duties and pressures with little or no residents / constituency obligations, thus allowing him more time for his family and the causes that interested him. With the end of the Napoleonic Wars and peacetime issues commanding more attention after decades of war footings, from 1816 on,  Wilberforce introduced a series of bills which would require the compulsory registration of slaves, together with details of their country of origin, permitting the illegal importation of foreign slaves to be detected. Later in the same year he began publicly to denounce slavery itself, though he did not demand immediate emancipation, as "They had always thought the slaves incapable of liberty at present, but hoped that by degrees a change might take place as the natural result of the abolition."

By 1820, after a period of poor health, and with his eyesight failing, Wilberforce took the decision to further limit his public activities, although he became embroiled in unsuccessful mediation / reconciliation attempts between King George IV, and his estranged wife Caroline of Brunswick, who had sought her rights as queen of the realm. Nevertheless, Wilberforce still hoped "to lay a foundation for some future measures for the emancipation of the poor slaves", which he believed should come about gradually in stages. Aware that the cause would need younger men to continue the work, in 1821 he asked fellow MP Thomas Fowell Buxton to take over leadership of the campaign in the Commons. As the 1820s wore on, Wilberforce increasingly became more of a figurehead for the abolitionist movement, although he continued to appear at anti-slavery meetings, welcoming visitors, and maintaining a busy correspondence on the subject.

The year 1823 saw the founding of the Society for the Mitigation and Gradual Abolition of Slavery (later known as the Anti-Slavery Society), and the publication of Wilberforce's 56-page polemic document "Appeal to the Religion, Justice and Humanity of the Inhabitants of the British Empire in Behalf of the Negro Slaves in the West Indies". In his treatise, Wilberforce urged that total emancipation was morally and ethically required, and that slavery was a national crime that must be ended by parliamentary legislation to gradually abolish slavery. Members of Parliament did not quickly agree, and continued government/ministry opposition in March 1823 stymied Wilberforce's renewed call for abolition. On 15 May 1823, Buxton moved another resolution in Parliament for gradual emancipation. Subsequent debates followed on 16 March and 11 June 1824 in which Wilberforce made his last speeches in the House of Commons, and which again saw the emancipationists outmanoeuvred by the ministry  government.

Last years
Wilberforce's health was continuing to fail, and he suffered further illnesses in 1824 and 1825. With his family concerned that his life was endangered, he declined a peerage and resigned his seat in Parliament, leaving the campaign in the hands of others. Thomas Clarkson continued to travel, visiting anti-slavery groups throughout Britain, motivating activists and acting as an ambassador for the anti-slavery cause to other countries, while Buxton pursued the cause of reform in Parliament. Public meetings and petitions demanding emancipation continued, with an increasing number supporting immediate abolition rather than the gradual approach favoured by Wilberforce, Clarkson and their colleagues.

In 1826, Wilberforce moved from his large house in Kensington Gore to Highwood Hill, a more modest property in the countryside of Mill Hill, north of London, where he was soon joined by his son William and family. William had attempted a series of educational and career paths, and a venture into farming in 1830 led to huge losses, which his father repaid in full, despite offers from others to assist. This left Wilberforce with little income, and he was obliged to let his home and spend the rest of his life visiting family members and friends. He continued his support for the anti-slavery cause, including attending and chairing meetings of the Anti-Slavery Society.

Death
Wilberforce approved of the 1830 election victory of the more progressive Whigs, though he was concerned about the implications of their Reform Bill which proposed the redistribution of parliamentary seats towards newer towns and cities and an extension of the franchise. In the event, the Reform Act 1832 was to bring more abolitionist MPs into Parliament as a result of intense and increasing public agitation against slavery. In addition, the 1832 slave revolt in Jamaica convinced government ministers that abolition was essential to avoid further rebellion.
In 1833, Wilberforce's health declined further and he suffered a severe attack of influenza from which he never fully recovered. He made a final anti-slavery speech in April 1833 at a public meeting in Maidstone, Kent. The following month, the Whig government introduced the Bill for the Abolition of Slavery, formally saluting Wilberforce in the process. On 26 July 1833, Wilberforce heard of government concessions that guaranteed the passing of the Bill for the Abolition of Slavery. The following day he grew much weaker, and he died early on the morning of 29 July at his cousin's house in Cadogan Place, London.

One month later, the House of Lords passed the Slavery Abolition Act, which abolished slavery in most of the British Empire from August 1834. They voted plantation owners £20 million in compensation, giving full emancipation to children younger than six, and instituting a system of apprenticeship requiring other enslaved peoples to work for their former masters for four to six years in the British West Indies, South Africa, Mauritius, British Honduras and Canada. Nearly 800,000 African slaves were freed, the vast majority in the Caribbean.

Funeral
Wilberforce had requested that he be buried with his sister and daughter at St Mary's Church, Stoke Newington, just north of London. However, the leading members of both Houses of Parliament urged that he be honoured with a burial in Westminster Abbey. The family agreed and, on 3 August 1833, Wilberforce was buried in the north transept, close to his friend William Pitt the Younger. The funeral was attended by many Members of Parliament, as well as by members of the public. The pallbearers included the Duke of Gloucester, the Lord Chancellor Henry Brougham and the Speaker of the House of Commons Charles Manners-Sutton.

While tributes were paid and Wilberforce was laid to rest, both Houses of Parliament suspended their business as a mark of respect.

Legacy

Five years after his death, sons Robert and Samuel Wilberforce published a five-volume biography about their father, and subsequently a collection of his letters in 1840. The biography was controversial in that the authors emphasised Wilberforce's role in the abolition movement and played down the important work of Thomas Clarkson. Incensed, Clarkson came out of retirement to write a book refuting their version of events, and the sons eventually made a half-hearted private apology to him and removed the offending passages in a revision of their biography. However, for more than a century, Wilberforce's role in the campaign dominated the history books. Later historians have noted the warm and highly productive relationship between Clarkson and Wilberforce, and have termed it one of history's great partnerships: without both the parliamentary leadership supplied by Wilberforce and the research and public mobilisation organised by Clarkson, abolition could not have been achieved.

As his sons had desired and planned, Wilberforce has long been viewed as a Christian hero, a statesman-saint held up as a role model for putting his faith into action. More broadly, he has also been described as a humanitarian reformer who contributed significantly to reshaping the political and social attitudes of the time by promoting concepts of social responsibility and action. In the 1940s, the role of Wilberforce and the Clapham Sect in abolition was downplayed by historian Eric Williams, who argued that abolition was motivated not by humanitarianism but by economics, as the West Indian sugar industry was in decline. Williams' approach strongly influenced historians for much of the latter part of the 20th century. However, more recent historians have noted that the sugar industry was still making large profits at the time of the abolition of the slave trade, and this has led to a renewed interest in Wilberforce and the Evangelicals, as well as a recognition of the anti-slavery movement as a prototype for subsequent humanitarian campaigns.

Memorials
Wilberforce's life and work have been widely commemorated. In Westminster Abbey, a seated statue of Wilberforce by Samuel Joseph was erected in 1840, bearing an epitaph praising his Christian character and his long labour to abolish the slave trade and slavery itself.

In Wilberforce's home town of Hull, a public subscription in 1834 funded the Wilberforce Monument, a  Greek Doric column topped by a statue of Wilberforce, which now stands in the grounds of Hull College near Queen's Gardens. Wilberforce's birthplace was acquired by the city corporation in 1903 and, following renovation, Wilberforce House in Hull was opened as Britain's first slavery museum. Wilberforce Memorial School for the Blind in York was established in 1833 in his honour, and in 2006 the University of Hull established the Wilberforce Institute for the study of Slavery and Emancipation in Oriel Chambers, a building adjoining Wilberforce's birthplace.

Various churches within the Anglican Communion commemorate Wilberforce in their liturgical calendars, and Wilberforce University in Ohio, United States, founded in 1856, is named after him. The university was the first owned by African-American people, and is a historically black college. In Ontario, Canada, Wilberforce Colony was founded by black reformers, and inhabited by free slaves from the United States.

Amazing Grace, a film about Wilberforce and the struggle against the slave trade, directed by Michael Apted and starring Ioan Gruffudd and Benedict Cumberbatch was released in 2007 to coincide with the 200th anniversary of Parliament's anti-slave trade legislation.

Bibliography

See also

 List of abolitionist forerunners
 List of civil rights leaders
 North Algona Wilberforce
 The Wilberforce Institute for the study of Slavery and Emancipation
 The Wilberforce Society
 Wilberforce, Ontario

References

Notes

Citations

Sources

 
 
 
 
 
 
 
 
 
 
 
 
 
 Coffey, John. "‘Tremble, Britannia!’: Fear, Providence and the Abolition of the Slave Trade, 1758–1807." English Historical Review 127.527 (2012): 844–881.
 
 
 
 
 
 
 
 
 
  online free to borrow

External links

 
 BBC historic figures: William Wilberforce
 BBC Humber articles on Wilberforce and abolition
 Wilberforce Institute for the study of Slavery and Emancipation
 
 
 
 
 Wilberforce, BBC Radio 4 In Our Time with Melvyn Bragg (22 February 2007)
This includes an engraving by Edward Scriven of George Richmond's portrait.

|-

|-

|-

|-

|-

1759 births
1833 deaths
18th-century English people
19th-century English people
Alumni of St John's College, Cambridge
British MPs 1780–1784
British MPs 1784–1790
British MPs 1790–1796
British MPs 1796–1800
Burials at Westminster Abbey
Clapham Sect
English abolitionists
English Anglicans
English evangelicals
English philanthropists
Evangelical Anglicans
Independent members of the House of Commons of Great Britain
Independent members of the House of Commons of the United Kingdom
Members of the Parliament of the United Kingdom for English constituencies
Members of the Parliament of Great Britain for English constituencies
UK MPs 1801–1802
UK MPs 1802–1806
UK MPs 1806–1807
UK MPs 1807–1812
UK MPs 1812–1818
UK MPs 1818–1820
UK MPs 1820–1826
Wilberforce University
People educated at Hull Grammar School
People educated at Pocklington School
Anglican saints
Politicians from Kingston upon Hull
British reformers
British abolitionists
William
Christian abolitionists
Christian humanists
Christian radicals